The following is a list of notable deaths in December 2014.

Entries for each day are listed alphabetically by surname. A typical entry lists information in the following sequence:
Name, age, country of citizenship and reason for notability, established cause of death, reference.

December 2014

1
Ray Abeyta, 58, American painter, motorcycle accident.
Mario Abramovich, 88, Argentine violinist and composer.
Mihailo Čanak, 82, Serbian architect and researcher.
Jimmy Duncan, 83, Scottish footballer (Celtic).
Alberto Breccia Guzzo, 68, Uruguayan politician.
David Cooke, 59, British rear admiral, Commander Operations (2006–2009).
Allen Phillips Griffiths, 87, Welsh professor.
Kim Song-ae, 89, North Korean politician, second wife of Kim Il-sung. (death announced on this date)
Sita Murt, 68, Spanish fashion designer and businesswoman, cancer.
Aleksandar Petrović, 55, Serbian basketball coach, amyotrophic lateral sclerosis.
Roberto Sagastume Pinto, 70, Guatemalan politician, Mayor of Esquipulas (1996–2000), Governor of Chiquimula (2001–2003), traffic collision.
Dimitrios Trichopoulos, 76, Greek-born American epidemiologist and oncologist, advanced the Mediterranean diet, heart attack.
Rocky Wood, 55, New Zealand-born Australian author, amyotrophic lateral sclerosis.

2
Don L. Anderson, 81, American geophysicist, cancer.
A. R. Antulay, 85, Indian politician, Chief Minister of Maharashtra (1980–1982).
Dominique Aubier, 92, French author.
Jean Béliveau, 83, Canadian Hall of Fame ice hockey player (Montreal Canadiens).
Josie Cichockyj, 50, British wheelchair basketball player, cancer.
Gerry DeLeeuw, 88, Canadian football player.
Theill Drengsgaard, 87, Danish footballer.
Gerry Fisher, 88, British cinematographer (Highlander, Running on Empty, Wise Blood).
Juan Flores, 71, American educator, professor of social and cultural analysis, Guillain–Barré syndrome.
Peter Furneaux, 79, English football club chairman and investor (Grimsby Town).
Andre Gill, 73, Canadian ice hockey player (Boston Bruins).
Peter Gübeli, 89, Swiss Olympic rower.
André Le Guillerm, 90, French Olympic weightlifter.
Bobby Keys, 70, American saxophonist (The Rolling Stones), cirrhosis.
Don Laws, 85, American figure skater and coach, heart failure.
Carlos Mamery, 54, Puerto Rican music producer and television personality (Idol Puerto Rico), heart attack.
A. J. McNamara, 78, American legislator and federal judge, progressive supranuclear palsy.
Lyudmila Perepyolkina, 84, Russian actress.
Hans-Dieter Riechel, 79, German Olympic biathlete.
Giampaolo Rugarli, 81, Italian novelist.
Jeff Truman, 57, Australian screenwriter and actor (Neighbours, Superman Returns, Home and Away).
Deven Verma, 77, Indian film actor.
Dennis Walaker, 73, American politician, Mayor of Fargo, North Dakota (since 2006), kidney cancer.

3
Herman Badillo, 85, Puerto Rican-born American politician, member of the U.S. House from New York's 22nd (1971–1973) and 21st (1973–1977) districts, heart failure.
Jacques Barrot, 77, French politician, European Commissioner for Justice, Freedom and Security (2008–2010).
Poppy Bermúdez, 86, Argentine-born Dominican chief executive (Bermúdez).
Nathaniel Branden, 84, Canadian-born American psychologist.
L. Stephen Coles, 73, American scientist, co-founder and the Executive Director of the Gerontology Research Group, pancreatic cancer.
Lulu Dikana, 35, South African recording artist and vocalist, oesophageal perforation.
Hubert Egger, 87, German cross country skier.
Martha Farkas Glaser, 93, Civil Rights Activist and Manager of Jazz musician Erroll Garner.
Sjefke Janssen, 95, Dutch racing cyclist.
Vicente Leñero, 81, Mexican writer and journalist, pulmonary emphysema.
Kostas Linoxilakis, 81, Greek footballer.
Ann Marcus, 93, American television screenwriter (Days of Our Lives, General Hospital, Peyton Place).
Vincent L. McKusick, 93, American attorney, Chief Justice of Maine (1977–1992).
Ian McLagan, 69, English keyboardist (Small Faces), stroke.
Alfred E. Novak, 84, American-born Brazilian Roman Catholic prelate, Bishop of Paranaguá (1989–2006).
Patrick Edward O'Connor, 82, New Zealand-born Tokelauan Roman Catholic prelate, Ecclesiastical Superior of Tokelau (1992–2011).
Luc Oursel, 55, French businessman, CEO of Areva (2011–2014).
Giulio Questi, 90, Italian director and screenwriter (Django Kill, La morte ha fatto l'uovo).
Walter Reyno, 79, Uruguayan actor, respiratory failure.
Jack Scott, 85, American college football coach.
James Stewart, 73, Canadian mathematician and violinist, multiple myeloma.
Jim Swink, 78, American football player (Dallas Texans), lymphoma.
Sergio Armando Valls, 73, Mexican judge, member of the Supreme Court (since 2004).
Ray Williams, 87, Welsh rugby union coach.

4
Sitamadji Allarassem, 25, Chadian footballer.
Mariam Behnam, 93, Iranian-born Emirati writer, diplomat and women's rights activist.
Richard Bootzin, 74, American psychologist, heart disease.
Nikolay Brusentsov, 89, Russian computer scientist.
Bryan Burwell, 59, American sportswriter, cancer.
Brian Dunsworth, 89, Canadian football player.
Hroar Elvenes, 82, Norwegian Olympic speed skater (1952, 1956, 1960, 1964).
Claudia Emerson, 57, American poet, complications of colon cancer.
Frank and Louie, 15, American-born Ragdoll cat, world's oldest diprosopus cat, euthanized.
Graeme Goodall, 82, Australian recording engineer and record label owner, co-founder of Island Records.
Jack Gregory, 87, American football coach (Rhode Island Rams).
Talât Sait Halman, 83, Turkish poet and academic, Minister of Culture and Tourism (1971).
V. R. Krishna Iyer, 99, Indian judge, member of the Supreme Court.
Lynne Kosky, 56, Australian politician, MLA for Altona (1996–2010), breast cancer.
Bob Montgomery, 77, American songwriter ("Heartbeat", "Misty Blue"), Parkinson's disease.
Gavril Nagy, 82, Romanian Olympic water polo player.
Aleksey Nasedkin, 72, Russian pianist and composer. 
Hugo Niskanen, 94, Finnish Olympic long-distance runner (1952).
Jeremy Thorpe, 85, British politician, Leader of the Liberal Party (1967–1976), MP for North Devon (1959–1979), central figure in the Thorpe affair, Parkinson's disease.
Rudolf Vanmoerkerke, 90, Belgian businessman.

5
Yashaw Adem, Turkish actor.
Ernest C. Brace, 83, American pilot, longest civilian POW in Vietnam War.
John C. Burton, 91, American cross country skier.
Manuel De Sica, 65, Italian composer, heart attack.
Queen Fabiola of Belgium, 86, Spanish-born queen consort of King Baudouin.
Ralph Adam Fine, 73, American judge, member of the Wisconsin Court of Appeals.
Rod Graber, 84, American baseball player.
Jackie Healy-Rae, 83, Irish politician, TD for Kerry South (1997–2011).
Luis Herrera de la Fuente, 98, Mexican conductor and composer.
Koichi Kawakita, 72, Japanese special effects director (Godzilla vs. Biollante).
Arthur Leipzig, 96, American photographer.
Gil Marks, 62, American food writer and historian, lung cancer.
Dennis Marriott, 75, English cricketer.
Gennadi Poloka, 84, Russian Soviet-era film director.
Marco Torlonia, 6th Prince of Civitella-Cesi, 77, Spanish nobleman.
Silvio Zavala, 105, Mexican historian and diplomat, Ambassador to France (1966–1975).

6
Ralph H. Baer, 92, American video game pioneer, inventor and engineer, developed the Magnavox Odyssey, recipient of the National Medal of Technology (2004).
Mick Barry, 95, Irish road bowler.
Robert T. Bennett, 75, American politician.
Jimmy Del Ray, 52, American professional wrestler (WWF, WCW), traffic collision.
Fred Hawkins, 91, American golfer.
Menis Koumandareas, 83, Greek writer.
Naphtali Lau-Lavie, 88, Israeli writer and diplomat.
Renato Mambor, 78, Italian painter.
Juan Antonio Merlos, 73, Salvadoran football player (Águila, national team) and manager.
Nick Nicolau, 81, American football coach.
Oscar Whisky, 9, Irish-bred British-trained Thoroughbred racehorse, fall.
Takao Saito, 85, Japanese cinematographer, chronic lymphocytic leukemia.
Adnan Gulshair el Shukrijumah, 39, Saudi Arabian-born external operations chief (al-Qaeda), shot.
Luke Somers, 33, British-born American photojournalist and AQAP hostage, shot.
Emma Lou Thayne, 90, American Mormon poet.
István Varga, 71, Hungarian Olympic handball player.
Stella Young, 32, Australian comedian and disability advocate.

7
Abdellah Baha, 60, Moroccan politician, Minister of State (since 2012), MP for Rabat (since 2002), hit by train.
Horace Batten, 102, English shoemaker and bootmaker.
João de Sousa, 90, Portuguese Olympic rower.
Lawrence Dorr, 89, Hungarian-American writer.
Charlie Flowers, 77, American football player (Los Angeles Chargers, Ole Miss Rebels).
Brian Roy Goble, 57, Canadian musician (Subhumans), heart attack.
Irving Guttman, 86, Canadian opera director.
Carol Judge, 73, American healthcare advocate and registered nurse, First Lady of Montana (1973–1980), cancer.
Mark Lewis, 60, American storyteller, actor and teacher.
Norman Mair, 86, Scottish rugby union player and journalist.
Eddie Rouse, 60, American actor (American Gangster, Pineapple Express, Being Flynn), liver failure.
Grahanandan Singh, 88, Indian Olympic field hockey player.
Khalil Ullah Khan, 80, Bangladeshi film and television actor.
Tommy Todd, 88, Scottish footballer (Airdrie, Hamilton, Crewe, Derby and Rochdale).
Nikolai Vasenin, 95, Russian World War II veteran, Legion of Honour recipient.
Ken Weatherwax, 59, American actor (The Addams Family), heart attack.
Jerzy Wilim, 73, Polish footballer.

8
Paul S. Amenta, 92, American politician, member of the Connecticut Senate.
Sacvan Bercovitch, 81, Canadian literary and cultural critic.
James Brown, 83, Scottish cricketer.
Robert N. Burr, 98, American historian.
Martha Cecilia, 61, Filipino writer, cancer.
Sobho Gianchandani, 94, Pakistani writer and social scientist, heart attack.
Tom Gosnell, 63, Canadian politician, Mayor of London, Ontario (1986–1994), cancer.
Buddy Hicks, 87, American baseball player (Detroit Tigers), complications from a fall.
Russ Kemmerer, 84, American baseball player (Washington Senators, Chicago White Sox).
Nedunuri Krishnamurthy, 87, Indian carnatic vocalist, lung cancer.
Mango, 60, Italian singer, heart attack.
Ralph Maud, 85, Canadian literary scholar.
Knut Nystedt, 99, Norwegian orchestral and choral composer.
Brian Sullivan, 48, American lawyer and politician, member of the Washington House of Representatives (1997–2001), assistant district attorney of Barrow, Alaska, shot.
Elmārs Zemgalis, 91, Latvian-born American chess player.

9
Dave Behrman, 73, American football player (Buffalo Bills, Denver Broncos), pancreatic cancer.
Tony Bullen, 83, British Olympic speed skater.
Ion Butmalai, 50, Moldovan politician, MP (since 2009), suicide by gunshot.
Frank Farrington, 88, Australian rugby league player and administrator (Newtown Jets).
José Feghali, 53, Brazilian pianist, suicide by gunshot.
Jane Freilicher, 90, American representational painter.
Stuart Hunt, 87, American politician, member of the Vermont House of Representatives.
Robert Kinoshita, 100, American production designer (Lost in Space, Forbidden Planet).
Gerd Kirste, 96, Norwegian politician.
Jean-Marie Léyé, 82, Ni-Vanuatu politician, President (1994–1999).
Jorge María Mejía, 91, Argentine Roman Catholic prelate, cardinal, Archivist of the Vatican Secret Archives (1998–2003), Librarian of the Vatican Library (1998–2003).
Mary Ann Mobley, 77, American actress (Diff'rent Strokes, Falcon Crest) and television personality, Miss America (1959), breast cancer.
Lydia Mordkovitch, 70, Russian-born British violinist, cancer.
Blagoje Paunović, 67, Serbian football player and manager.
Karl Otto Pöhl, 85, German economist, President of the Bundesbank (1980–1991).
Lila Sapinsley, 92, American politician, member of the Rhode Island Senate (1973–1984).
Sheila Stewart, 77, Scottish singer, storyteller, and author.
Dave Theisen, 73, American football player (Toronto Argonauts, Winnipeg Blue Bombers).
Jože Toporišič, 88, Slovene linguist.
Clifford Wright, 87, Canadian politician, Mayor of Saskatoon (1976–1988), lung cancer.

10
Ziad Abu Ein, 55, Palestinian politician, coronary blockage from heart hemorrhage.
John P. Anton, 94, American philosopher.
Anubes da Silva, 79, Brazilian Olympic sprinter.
Don Dufek Sr., 85, American football player.
Pierre Fautrier, 91, French cyclist.
Ralph Giordano, 91, German writer and publicist, complications from hip fracture.
Raúl Gómez Ramírez, 50, Mexican politician, MP for Guanajuato (since 2012), injuries sustained in a traffic collision.
Slađa Guduraš, 27, Bosnian singer and actress, traffic collision.
Alice Hoover, 86, American baseball player (All-American Girls Professional Baseball League).
Catherine Hughes, 81, British diplomat and academic.
Donald Moffitt, 83, American science fiction author.
Robert B. Oakley, 83, American diplomat, Ambassador to Zaire (1979–1982), Somalia (1982–1984) and Pakistan (1988–1991), Parkinson's disease.
Otto Pöggeler, 85, German philosopher.
Bob Solinger, 88, Canadian ice hockey player (Detroit Red Wings, Toronto Maple Leafs).
Judy Baar Topinka, 70, American politician, Illinois Treasurer (1995–2007) and Comptroller (since 2011), complications related to a stroke.
Gerard Vianen, 70, Dutch racing cyclist, leukemia.
Robert Wolfe, 93, American historian, archivist and World War II veteran.
Martin Zijlstra, 70, Dutch politician, member of the House of Representatives (1989–2002).

11
Tom Adams, 76, English actor (The Great Escape, Licensed to Kill, Doctor Who), cancer.
Ahmed al Tilemsi, 36-37, Malian terrorist, shot.
George Ardisson, 83, Italian actor (The Long Hair of Death, Agent 3S3: Passport to Hell).
Roger Bielle, 86, French Olympic wrestler.
Tim Black, 77, English family planning pioneer, founder of Marie Stopes International.
Vera Bulatova, 82, Uzbek archaeologist, architectural historian and museologist.
Peter Clarke, 81, English chess player.
Harold Crocker, 86, Australian rugby league footballer.
Benigno De Grandi, 90, Italian footballer (Palermo, A.C. Milan).
John D. Driggs, 87, American politician, Mayor of Phoenix, Arizona (1970–1974), established the Phoenix Mountain Preserve, pancreatitis.
Michel du Cille, 58, American photojournalist (The Washington Post), heart attack.
Sergio Fiorentini, 80, Italian actor and voice actor.
Patricia Gallaher, 77, Australian librarian.
Robert A. Johnson, 93, American politician.
Philip Knights, Baron Knights, 94, English police officer and peer, Chief Constable of the West Midlands (1975–1985).
Georges Lagrange, 85, French Roman Catholic prelate, Bishop of Gap (1988–2003).
Fred Meggs, 62, American composer, cancer.
Mel Richardson, 86, American politician, member of the Idaho House of Representatives (1988–1992) and Senate (1992–2008), cancer.
Dawn Sears, 53, American country musician (Nothin' but Good), lung cancer.
Gerald Sim, 89, English actor (Gandhi, Patriot Games, Frenzy).
Robert Taylor, 70, American animator, film director and screenwriter (The Nine Lives of Fritz the Cat), chronic obstructive pulmonary disease.
Laszlo Varga, 89, Hungarian-born American cellist.
Hans Wallat, 85, German conductor and music director.

12
John Baxter, 78, Scottish footballer (Hibernian).
Rod Belcher, 94, American football and basketball announcer.
Norman Bridwell, 86, American author and cartoonist (Clifford the Big Red Dog), heart failure.
James Clarke, 91, English footballer.
Peter Delisle, 79, English cricketer.
Jonathan Dunn-Rankin, 84, American actor, television journalist and activist.
Phillip Edwards, 87, British rear admiral and bursar.
Ivor Grattan-Guinness, 73, English historian of mathematics and logic.
John Hampton, 61, American music engineer and producer, complications of cancer.
José María Lorant, 59, Argentine football player and coach.
Donald S. Malecki, 81, American author and insurance consultant.
Billy Milligan, 59, American criminal defendant diagnosed with multiple personality disorder, cancer.
John Persen, 73, Norwegian composer.
Herb Plews, 86, American baseball player (Washington Senators).
Mohammad Shahid, 66, Indian cricketer.
Yury Shutov, 68, Russian politician, heart attack.
Vladimír Stibořík, 87, Czech Olympic sports shooter (1960, 1964).
Graham Turbott, 100, New Zealand ornithologist.
Mary Jeanne van Appledorn, 87, American composer.
Alan Ward, 79, New Zealand historian.
Dave West, 70, British businessman, stabbed.

13
Yvonne Abbas, 92, member of the French Resistance.
Ernst Albrecht, 84, German politician, Prime Minister of Lower Saxony (1976–1990).
Mary Arden, 81, American actress.
Norbert P. Arnold, 94, American mechanical engineer, businessman, and politician.
Joan Barril, 62, Spanish writer and journalist, pneumonia.
Ina Bauer, 73, German figure skater.
Anthony Birch, 90, British political scientist.
Bill Bonds, 82, American television news anchor (WXYZ-TV), heart attack.
Geoffrey Cooper, 89, British RAF officer.
Aaron Goldberg, 97, American botanist.
John Hickman, 87, New Zealand meteorologist.
Janis Martin, 75, American opera singer.
William E. May, 86, American theologian.
Andreas Schockenhoff, 57, German politician, MP (since 1990).
Martha Sigall, 97, American animator (Looney Tunes).
Phil Stern, 95, American photographer, emphysema and heart failure.
Brian Swatuk, 65, Canadian jockey, cancer.
Taitetsu Unno, 85, Japanese Shin Buddhist scholar and author.

14
Angalifu, 44, Sudanese-born American rhinoceros, one of two remaining male northern white rhinoceros.
Fatima bint Rashid Al Nuaimi, Emirati Ajman royal.
Anoushirvan Arjmand, 73, Iranian actor, heart attack.
Daniel Beren, 85, American politician.
Sy Berger, 91, American baseball promoter.
Franz Brunner, 83, Austrian Olympic wrestler.
Joe Carr, 63, American bluegrass musician, stroke.
Alex Chigogidze, 59, Georgian general topologist.
Theo Colborn, 87, American environmentalist and academic.
Irene Dalis, 89, American opera singer and impresario.
Bobo Faulkner, 73, English model and television personality, cancer.
Millie Kirkham, 91, American singer.
Louis Alphonse Koyagialo, 67, Congolese politician, Acting Prime Minister of the Democratic Republic of the Congo (2012).
Doug Martin, 78, American college basketball coach (South Dakota Coyotes).
John McCraw, 89, New Zealand soil scientist.
Bess Myerson, 90, American model (Miss America 1945) and television actress.
Anthony Edward Pevec, 89, American Roman Catholic prelate, Auxiliary Bishop of Cleveland (1982–2001).
P. J. Sarma, 70, Indian actor and dubbing artist, heart attack.
Rohit Talwar, 49, Indian cricketer, cancer.
Fuzzy Thurston, 80, American football player (Green Bay Packers), Alzheimer's disease and cancer.
Johnny Treadwell, 73, American football player (Texas Longhorns).

15
Chakri, 40, Indian film composer and playback singer, heart attack.
David R. Chesnutt, 73-74, American historian and editor, throat cancer.
Booth Colman, 91, American actor (Planet of the Apes, Norma Rae, Intolerable Cruelty).
Herbert E. Douglass, 87, American theologian.
David Garth, 84, American political consultant.
Michael Hare Duke, 89, Scottish Anglican bishop.
Mustapha Maarof, 79, Malaysian actor.
Nicolae Manea, 60, Romanian football player and manager, liver cancer.
Donald Metcalf, 85, Australian medical researcher, pancreatic cancer.
Ray Steadman-Allen, 92, British composer and Salvation Army officer.
Arthur Whyte, 93, Australian politician, President of the South Australian Legislative Council (1978–1985).
Fausto Zapata, 73, Mexican journalist, politician and diplomat, Governor of San Luis Potosí (1991), cancer.

16
Phillip Archuleta, 65, American politician, member of the New Mexico House of Representatives (since 2013), pneumonia.
J. K. M. A. Aziz, Bangladeshi politician.
Anthony Bottrall, 76, British diplomat.
Martin Brasier, 67, English palaeobiologist and astrobiologist, traffic collision.
Inés Cifuentes, 59, English-born American seismologist and educator, breast cancer.
Tim Cochran, 59, American mathematician.
Yvonne Cossart, 80, Australian virologist.
Reidar Dørum, 89, Norwegian footballer (FK Ørn-Horten).
Maurice Duverger, 97, French jurist, sociologist and politician.
Jack Hazlett, 76, New Zealand rugby union player (Southland, national team).
Abdulmari Imao, 78, Filipino sculptor.
Karl-Heinz Kurras, 87, German police officer and Stasi member, killed Benno Ohnesorg.
Man Haron Monis, 50, Iranian self-styled Muslim cleric and hostage taker, shot.
Maximo Munzi, 57, Argentine cinematographer, pancreatic cancer.
Romie J. Palmer, 93, American politician, member of the Illinois House of Representatives.
Wendy Rene, 67, American soul singer, complications from stroke.
Rock Scully, 73, American band manager (Grateful Dead), lung cancer.
Sultan Singh, 91, Indian politician, Governor of Tripura (1989–1990).
Ernie Terrell, 75, American heavyweight boxer, WBA champion (1965–1967).

17
Judith Baker, 75, American judoka.
Eric Bjornstad, 80, American climber and author.
*Chan Kwok-Hung, 51, Chinese cinematographer (Fly Me to Polaris, Skiptrace), drowned.
Hildward Croes, 52, Aruban musician, composer and arranger, cancer.
Stephen Youssef Doueihi, 87, Lebanese-born American Maronite Catholic hierarch, Bishop of St. Maron of Brooklyn (1997–2004).
Neville Featherstone-Griffin, 81, English cricketer (Surrey).
Clarke Fraser, 94, Canadian medical geneticist.
Fritz Rudolf Fries, 79, German writer.
Dieter Grau, 101, German-born American rocket scientist, NASA Quality Control Director for the Saturn V.
Neil James, 53, English rugby league player.
Richard C. Hottelet, 97, American broadcast journalist (Murrow's Boys).
Leonard Kent, 89, New Zealand cricketer.
Stephen J. Kopp, 63, American educator, President of Marshall University (since 2005), heart attack.
Oleh Lysheha, 65, Ukrainian poet, playwright and translator.
Daniel Sitentu Mpasi, 80, Namibian tribal leader, King of the Uukwangali.
Jarle Ofstad, 87, Norwegian physician.
Lowell Steward, 95, American World War II veteran, member of the Tuskegee Airmen.
Takeshi Taketsuru, 90, Japanese whisky distiller (Nikka).
Ivan Vekić, 76, Croatian politician.
Jean Walraven, 88, American Olympic hurdler.

18
Donald J. Albosta, 89, American politician, member of the United States House of Representatives from Michigan's 10th district (1979–1985).
Virginia Baxter, 82, American figure skater.
John Beedell, 81, New Zealand-born Canadian Olympic sprint canoer (1960).
Gideon Ben-Yisrael, 91, Israeli politician, member of the Knesset.
Franco Bomprezzi, 62, Italian journalist and writer.
Boyd Brown, 62, American football player.
Bill J. Dukes, 87, American politician, member of the Alabama House of Representatives (1994–2010), Parkinson's disease.
Claude Frikart, 92, French Roman Catholic prelate, Auxiliary Bishop of Paris (1986–1997).
John Fry, 69, American record producer, founder of Ardent Studios, cardiac arrest.
Larry Henley, 77, American singer (The Newbeats) and songwriter ("Wind Beneath My Wings").
Bob Kelly, 74, American football player (Houston Oilers, Kansas City Chiefs, Cincinnati Bengals).
Ingvar Kjellson, 91, Swedish actor (Heja Roland!), pneumonia.
Virna Lisi, 78, Italian actress (How to Murder Your Wife, La Reine Margot), cancer.
Carleton Mabee, 99, American Pulitzer Prize-winning writer.
Neasa Ní Annracháin, 92, Irish actress.
Knud Pedersen, 88, Danish artist and resistance fighter.
Mandy Rice-Davies, 70, British model, figure in the Profumo affair, cancer.
Harold M. Schulweis, 89, American rabbi and activist.
Robert Simpson, 102, American meteorologist, co-developer of the Saffir–Simpson hurricane wind scale.
Larry Smith, 63, American record producer (Run–D.M.C.).
Deral Teteak, 85, American football player (Green Bay Packers).
*Tsang Siu-Fo, 91, Chinese police officer.
Ed Vereb, 80, American football player (Washington Redskins).
Ante Žanetić, 78, Croatian footballer, Olympic champion (1960).

19
Mohammed Aqeel, Pakistani militant, hanged.
S. S. Balan, 77, Indian media executive (Ananda Vikatan), heart attack.
Charles Bartlett, 93, British artist.
Philip Bradbourn, 63, British politician, MEP for West Midlands (since 1999), bowel cancer.
Calypso Mama, 88, Bahamian calypso singer.
Arthur Gardner, 104, American film and television producer (The Rifleman) and actor (All Quiet on the Western Front).
Pat Holton, 78, Scottish footballer (Motherwell, Hamilton Academical).
Barbara Jones, 62, Jamaican reggae/gospel singer, leukaemia.
Roberta Leigh, 87, British author and television producer (Space Patrol).
Éva Pajor, 77, Hungarian Olympian 
Igor Rodionov, 78, Russian general and politician, Minister of Defence (1996–1997).
Robert D. San Souci, 68, American children's author and screenwriter (Mulan), head injury.
Colin Strang, 2nd Baron Strang, 92, British philosopher and peer.
Dick Thornton, 75, American-born Canadian football player (Winnipeg Blue Bombers, Toronto Argonauts), lung cancer.
Chunilal Vaidya, 97, Indian political activist.

20
Lucio Abis, 88, Italian politician, President of Sardinia (1970), member of the Italian Senate (1972–1994).
Maqsudul Alam, 60, Bangladeshi scientist, liver cirrhosis.
Joe Anderson, 86, British rugby league player (Castleford, Leeds, Featherstone Rovers), kidney cancer.
Seriki Audu, 23, Nigerian footballer (Lobi Stars), traffic collision.
Larry Auerbach, 91, American television director (Love of Life, One Life to Live, As the World Turns), complications of glioblastoma.
Ronnie Bedford, 83, American jazz drummer.
Zdenko Bego, 81, Croatian rower.
Donald Charlton Bradley, 90, British chemist.
Per-Ingvar Brånemark, 85, Swedish orthopedic surgeon, heart attack.
Ismaaiyl Abdullah Brinsley, 28, American criminal, suicide.
Penny Dann, 50, British children’s book illustrator, cancer.
George Fisher, 90, American college basketball coach (Austin Peay).
John Freeman, 99, British politician, journalist, broadcaster and diplomat, MP for Watford (1945–1955), Ambassador to the United States (1969–1971).
Ranulph Glanville, 68, British architect and cybernetician.
James L. Kinsey, 80, American chemist.
Bob Lanier, 89, American businessman and politician, Mayor of Houston, Texas (1992–1998).
Brian Manley, 85, British engineer.
Sam Morris, 84, English footballer (Chester City).
William Lowell Putnam III, 90, American broadcasting executive (Springfield Television), Trustee Emeritus of the Lowell Observatory.
Gino Pellegrini, 73, Italian scenic designer (2001: A Space Odyssey, Mary Poppins, The Birds) and painter.
Miodrag B. Protić, 92, Serbian painter.
Derek Rencher, 82, English ballet dancer.
David Strudwick, 80, Australian cricketer.
Alberto Valdiri, 55, Colombian actor (Doña Bárbara, Yo soy Betty, la fea), heart attack.

21
Morteza Ahmadi, 90, Iranian actor.
Akhlas Akhlaq, 33, Pakistani-Russian convicted plotter, execution by hanging.
Anatole Beck, 84, American mathematician.
Jane Bown, 89, British photographer (The Observer).
Pedro Brescia Cafferata, 93, Peruvian businessman.
Sonya Butt, 90, British Special Operations Executive agent.
Walter De Buck, 80, Belgian singer and sculptor, esophageal cancer.
Dušan Dragosavac, 95, Yugoslavian politician, Chairman of the League of Communists of Yugoslavia  (1981–1982).
Andy Everest, 90, American football player and coach.
Horacio Ferrer, 81, Uruguayan poet, broadcaster and tango lyricist, heart failure.
Chris Hall, 64, Canadian lacrosse coach (Calgary Roughnecks, Vancouver Stealth), throat cancer.
High Chaparral, 15, Irish Thoroughbred racehorse, Epsom Derby winner (2002), euthanised.
Åke Johansson, 86, Swedish footballer (IFK Norrköping, national team).
Udo Jürgens, 80, Austrian composer and singer ("Reach for the Stars"), winner of the Eurovision Song Contest 1966. 
Bruce Lindahl, 95, American politician, member of the Minnesota House of Representatives (1965–1971).
Tom Nieporte, 86, American golfer.
Hans Riesel, 85, Swedish mathematician.
Sitor Situmorang, 91, Indonesian poet and writer.
Frank Truitt, 89, American basketball coach (LSU, Kent State).
Paul Walther, 87, American basketball player (University of Tennessee).
Billie Whitelaw, 82, English actress (The Omen, The Dark Crystal, Hot Fuzz).
Alan Williams, 84, British politician, MP for Swansea West (1964–2010), Father of the House (2005–2010).

22
John Robert Beyster, 90, American physicist, founder of Science Applications International Corporation.
Christine Cavanaugh, 51, American voice actress (Rugrats, Dexter's Laboratory, Babe, Darkwing Duck).
Joe Cocker, 70, British singer ("With a Little Help from My Friends", "You Are So Beautiful", "Up Where We Belong"), lung cancer.
Ulpiano Cos Villa, 79, Cuban baseball broadcaster.
Christopher Davidge, 85, British Olympic rower (1952, 1956, 1960).
Mayer Eisenstein, 68, American pediatrician and family physician.
William J. Fishman, 93, British academic.
Nate Fox, 37, American basketball player, shot.
Vera Gebuhr, 98, Danish actress (Matador).
Richard Graydon, 92, British stuntman and stunt coordinator (James Bond, Batman).
Abdel Aziz Mohamed Hegazy, 91, Egyptian politician, Prime Minister (1974–1975).
Gertrude Kolar, 88, Austrian Olympic gymnast (1948, 1952).
Maurizio Lotti, 74, Italian politician.
Rosemary Lowe-McConnell, 93, British biologist.
Catherine N. Norton, 73, American librarian.
Moses Otolorin, 67, Nigerian footballer (Shooting Stars), cancer.
Madhavi Sardesai, 52, Indian academic and writer, cancer.
Joseph Sargent, 89, American film director (The Taking of Pelham One Two Three, MacArthur, Jaws: The Revenge), heart disease.
Fritz Sdunek, 67, German professional boxing trainer (Wladimir and Vitali Klitschko, Felix Sturm), heart attack.
Walter Smishek, 89, Polish-born Canadian politician.
Brandon Stoddard, 77, American television executive (ABC), bladder cancer.
Bernard Stone, 87, American politician, Chicago Alderman (1973–2011), complications from a fall.
G. Venkatswamy, 85, Indian politician.

23
Evgeny Aramovich Abramyan, 84, Armenian physicist.
Raymond L. Acosta, 89, American district court judge.
K. Balachander, 84, Indian filmmaker and playwright.
Jo Jo Benson, 76, American singer.
Johnny Bergh, 80, Norwegian producer, director and screenwriter.
Jacques Chancel, 86, French journalist and writer, cancer.
Johnnie Colemon, 94, American theologian.
John Coll, British computer specialist.
Luis Condomi, 66, Argentine footballer.
Raymond M. Durkin, 78, American politician, complications related to heart failure and emphysema.
Mike Elliott, 68, British comedian and actor (Goal!, Billy Elliot), cancer.
Rustom K. S. Ghandhi, 90, Indian vice admiral.
Guilford Glazer, 93, American real estate developer and philanthropist.
Robert V. Hogg, 90, American statistician.
Alphonse J. Jackson, 87, American educator and civil rights activist, member of the Louisiana House of Representatives (1972–1992).
Jeremy Lloyd, 84, British screenwriter (Are You Being Served?, 'Allo 'Allo!), pneumonia.
Edward H. Martin, 83, American vice admiral.
Robert McCabe, 86, American educator.
Elvina Podchernikova-Elvorti, 86, Russian circus artist and animal trainer.
Přemek Podlaha, 76, Czech television personality.
John J. Powers, 96, American food scientist.
Nigel Priestley, 71, New Zealand earthquake engineer, cancer.
Debbie Purdy, 51, British campaigner for assisted suicide.
Hessel Rienks, 82, Dutch politician, member of the House of Representatives (1974–1989).
Craig Schiffer, 58, American financier (Lehman Brothers), avalanche.
Jerzy Semkow, 86, Polish-born French conductor. 
John Kennett Starnes, 96, Canadian civil servant, diplomat and novelist.
Norman Wray, 91, American Roman Catholic missionary, Alzheimer's disease.
Robert Zoellner, 82, American investor and stamp collector.
João Nílson Zunino, 68, Brazilian executive, President of Avaí FC (2002–2013).

24
Ekhlasuddin Ahmed, 74, Bangladeshi children's writer.
Mack Alston, 67, American football player (Washington Redskins).
Rubén Amorín, 87, Uruguayan football player and coach (Guatemala national team), Alzheimer's disease.
Tómas Árnason, 91, Icelandic politician.
Jeannine Baticle, 93-94, French art historian.
Leonard Beerman, 93, American Reform rabbi.
Giovanni Bersani, 100, Italian politician.
Jacqueline Briskin, 87, British-born American writer.
Donald Niel Cameron, 97, Canadian politician.
Anna M. Cienciala, 85, Polish-American historian and author.
Buddy DeFranco, 91, American jazz clarinet player.
Reidar Floeng, 96, Norwegian politician.
Edward Greenspan, 70, Canadian lawyer, heart failure.
Robert Hall, 87, American basketball player (Harlem Globetrotters).
Herbert Harris, 88, American politician, member of the U.S. House from Virginia's 8th district (1975–1981).
Lee Israel, 75, American author and forger.
Owen H. Johnson, 85, American politician, member of the New York State Senate (1972–2012).
Yevgeny Korolkov, 84, Russian gymnast, Olympic champion (1952).
Krzysztof Krauze, 61, Polish film director (The Debt, Plac Zbawiciela), prostate cancer.
Sir George Lepping, 67, Solomon Islands politician, Governor-General (1988–1994).
Arthur Louis, 64, American-born British reggae cross-over musician (Knockin' on Heaven's Door).
Hidetoshi Nakamura, 60, Japanese voice actor (Mobile Suit Victory Gundam, To Love-Ru).
Alf Næsheim, 88, Norwegian artist and writer.
Barry Williams, 70, English spree killer.
Ramsey Muir Withers, 84, Canadian army officer, Chief of the Defence Staff (1980–1983), heart attack.

25
Alberta Adams, 97, American blues singer.
N. L. Balakrishnan, 72, Indian actor and photographer.
Warren Brown, 85, Bermudian sailor and businessman.
Nand Chaturvedi, 91, Indian poet.
Chen Shi-chang, 80, Taiwanese politician, multiple organ failure.
Dave Comer, 58, New Zealand film location scout (The Lord of the Rings, The Hobbit), cancer.
Louis Boutet de Monvel, 73, French mathematician.
Geoffrey Eastop, 93, English potter.
Kjell Hanssen, 82, Norwegian politician.
Bernard Kay, 86, British actor (Doctor Who, Coronation Street, Doctor Zhivago).
Bruce Livingston, 87, Australian cricketer.
Mary F. Lyon, 89, British geneticist.
George Miller, 92, American politician, Mayor of Tucson, Arizona (1991–1999).
Ihor Nadein, 66, Ukrainian football player and coach.
Ricardo Porro, 89, Cuban-born architect.
David Ryall, 79, English actor (The Singing Detective, Harry Potter, The Elephant Man).
Jean Stogdon, 86, British campaigner and social worker (Grandparents Plus).
Tony Wilkinson, 66, British archaeologist.
Gleb Yakunin, 80, Russian priest and Soviet dissident.

26
Samson Alcantara, 79, Filipino politician and academic.
Stanisław Barańczak, 68, Polish poet and academic, pneumonia.
Al Belletto, 86, American jazz musician.
Roger L. Bernashe, 87, American politician.
Dick Dale, 88, American saxophonist and singer (The Lawrence Welk Show).
Roberto Delmastro, 69, Chilean politician, MP for Valdivia (1998–2010), lung cancer.
Rajan Devadas, 93, Indian photojournalist.
James B. Edwards, 87, American politician, Governor of South Carolina (1975–1979), United States Secretary of Energy (1981–1982), complications from a stroke.
Paul V. Gadola, 85, American senior judge, District Court Judge for the Eastern District of Michigan (1988–2008).
Lars-Erik Gustafsson, 76, Swedish Olympic athlete.
Joe Macko, 86, American baseball player and manager.
Giuseppe Pittau, 86, Italian Roman Catholic prelate, Secretary of Congregation for Catholic Education (1998–2003).
Geoff Pullar, 79, English Test cricketer (Lancashire).
Rhodes Reason, 84, American actor (Star Trek, Annie, 77 Sunset Strip).
John Richardson, Jr., 93, American political activist, Assistant Secretary of State for Educational and Cultural Affairs (1969–1977).
Ken Riddington, 92, British television producer (House of Cards).
Andrew Thomson, 78, British academic and historian.
Leo Tindemans, 92, Belgian politician, Prime Minister (1974–1978), Minister of Foreign Affairs (1981–1989).

27
*Ben Ammi Ben-Israel, 75, American-born Israeli religious leader (African Hebrew Israelites of Jerusalem).
Fatima Aouam, 55, Moroccan Olympic runner (1988).
Hans-Christian Bartel, 82, German violist and composer.
Graham Cox, 81, British judge.
Tom Currigan, 94, American politician, Mayor of Denver (1963–1968).
Carl Neumann Degler, 93, American historian and author, Pulitzer Prize winner (1972).
Timothy Joseph Dowd, 99, Irish-American police official.
Ulises Estrella, 75, Ecuadorian poet.
Claude Frank, 89, German-born American pianist, complications of dementia.
William P. Gerberding, 85, American educator, president of University of Washington.
Ron Henry, 80, English footballer (Tottenham Hotspur, national team).
Ronald Li, 85, Chinese stockbroker, Chairman of the Hong Kong Stock Exchange (1986–1987), cancer.
Kees Luesink, 61, Dutch politician, Mayor of Doesburg (since 2008).
Karel Poma, 94, Belgian politician and minister of state, MP (1965–1985), Mayor of Wilrijk (1953–1958).
Erich Retter, 89, German footballer (VfB Stuttgart, West Germany national team).
Tomaž Šalamun, 73, Slovene poet.
Carol Stone, 60, British transgender priest, pancreatic cancer.
Elaine Summers, 89, American choreographer (Judson Dance Theater) and filmmaker, complications of fall.
Hamid Taqavi, 58–59, Iranian brigadier general, shot.
Bridget Turner, 75, British actress (Doctor Who, Casualty, Z-Cars).
Jacques Vandenhaute, 83, Belgian politician, Mayor of Woluwe-Saint-Pierre (1983–2007).
John Webster, 89, British mycologist.

28
Leelah Alcorn, 17, American transgender girl, suicide.
Ruggero J. Aldisert, 95, American judge.
Paul Barry, 88, American football player.
Earl Clark, 95, American soldier.
Chris Dyko, 48, American football player (Chicago Bears), traffic collision.
Leopoldo Federico, 87, Argentine tango musician.
Javier Fragoso, 72, Mexican footballer (Club América, national team).
Vahan Hovhannisyan, 58, Armenian politician.
Michio Kushi, 88, Japanese-born American scholar, pancreatic cancer.
Michael C. Murphy, 62, American politician and pastor.
Frankie Randall, 76, American singer and actor, lung cancer.
Lewis Rudolph, 95, American businessman, co-founder of Krispy Kreme.
Jaakko Suikkari, 89, Finnish Olympic sprinter.
Merrill Womach, 87, American gospel singer.

29
Hardo Aasmäe, 63, Estonian geographer, entrepreneur and politician.
Rashid Al Zlami, 88, Saudi Arabian poet.
Natalie Carter Barraga, 99, American educator and researcher.
Patricia Hill Burnett, 94, American artist and women's rights activist.
Ernest de Soto, 91, American lithographer.
Dorrit Dekk, 97, Czechoslovakian graphic designer.
Saiyid Hamid, 94, Indian educator, Vice-Chancellor of Aligarh Muslim University (1980–1985).
Hari Harilela, 92, Indian-born Hong Kong hotelier.
Odd Iversen, 69, Norwegian footballer (Rosenborg, national team).
Madhu Kaithapram, 44, Indian film director (Eakantham, Madhya Venal).
Jaynie Krick, 85, American baseball player (All-American Girls Professional Baseball League).
Jack E. McCoy, 85, American politician.
Jenny Pat, 33, Hong Kong art dealer, accidental drug overdose.
Juanito Remulla, Sr., 81, Filipino politician, Governor of Cavite (1979–1986), multiple organ failure.
Sir Ivor Richardson, 84, New Zealand jurist, President of the Court of Appeal (1996–2002).
Ulf Sand, 76, Norwegian politician.
Howard Schultz, 61, American television producer (Extreme Makeover, Dating Naked).
Samuel Sentini, 66, Honduran footballer (Olimpia, national team), Alzheimer's disease.
Leslie Silver, 89, British football executive, Chairman of Leeds United (1983–1996).
Paul Sprenger, 74, American attorney, heart attack.
Bob Usher, 89, American baseball player (Cincinnati Reds).
André Wohllebe, 52, German Olympic champion sprint canoer (1992) and dual bronze medallist (1988).

30
Abdul Hamid Zainal Abidin, 70, Malaysian politician, heart attack.
Frank Atkinson, 90, British museum director (Beamish Museum).
Terry Becker, 93, American actor (The Twilight Zone, Voyage to the Bottom of the Sea).
Jake Berthot, 75, American artist.
Deborah Bone, 51, English mental health nurse, inspired Disco 2000, multiple myeloma.
Antonio Brack Egg, 74, Peruvian ecologist and politician, Minister of Environment (2008–2011).
Ronald Bromley, 96, British Army officer.
Robert Conroy, 76, American science fiction author, winner of the Sidewise Award for Alternate History, thymus cancer.
Philip Converse, 86, American political scientist.
Derek Coombs, 83, British politician, MP for Birmingham Yardley (1970–1974).
Hester A. Davis, 84, American archaeologist.
Roland de Corneille, 87, Canadian Anglican priest and politician.
Yolande Donlan, 94, American-born British actress.
George B. Fitch, 66, American politician, Mayor of Warrenton, Virginia (1998–2014), cancer.
Jim Galloway, 78, Scottish-born Canadian jazz clarinet and saxophone player.
Patrick Gowers, 78, English composer. 
Marian Jurczyk, 79, Polish politician and trade union activist (Solidarity), Mayor of Szczecin (1998–2000, 2002–2006).
Beau Kazer, 63, Canadian actor (The Young and the Restless, Taxi Driver).
Igor Kiselyov, 35, Russian footballer (Biolog-Novokubansk Progress, Torpedo Moscow), heart failure.
Dick Loggere, 93, Dutch Olympic field hockey player, silver medallist (1952) and bronze medallist (1948).
J. B. Moraes, 81, Indian poet and writer.
Rosemary Mulligan, 73, American politician, member of the Illinois House of Representatives (1993–2013).
Luise Rainer, 104, German-born American actress (The Great Ziegfeld, The Good Earth), Academy Award winner (1936, 1937), pneumonia.
Walter Roque, 77, Uruguayan football player (Uruguay national team) and coach (Venezuela national team).
Milton Rosen, 99, American rocket scientist and NASA executive, complications from prostate cancer.
T. E. Vasudevan, 97, Indian film producer (Snehaseema, Kavyamela).
B. G. Verghese, 87, Indian journalist and newspaper editor (Hindustan Times, The Indian Express).
Jan V. White, 86, American graphic designer.

31
Jim Bennett, 70, Irish hurler.
Giovanni Del Rio, 89, Italian politician, President of Sardinia (1967–1970, 1973–1976).
Jimmy Dunn, 91, Scottish footballer (Wolverhampton Wanderers, Derby County).
Edward Herrmann, 71, American actor (Gilmore Girls, Richie Rich, The Lost Boys), brain cancer.
Abdullah Hussain, 94, Malaysian novelist (Interlok).
Michael Kennedy, 88, British biographer, journalist and music critic.
Nejat Konuk, 86, Cypriot politician, Prime Minister of Northern Cyprus (1976–1978, 1983–1985).
Norbert Leser, 81, Austrian jurist, political scientist and social philosopher.
Marie Smallface Marule, 70, Canadian-Blackfoot academic administrator, activist, and educator, President of Red Crow Community College (since 1992).
James McNaughton Hester, 90, American academic, President of New York University (1962–1975).
Romanus Orjinta, 33, Nigerian footballer.
Luis Oruezábal, 62, Argentine footballer (Vélez Sársfield, Granada, national team), Pan American Games champion (1971), carbon monoxide poisoning.
Norm Phelps, 75, American author and animal rights activist.
Washington Rodríguez, 70, Uruguayan Olympic bantamweight boxer, bronze medallist (1964).
Kamala Sinha, 82, Indian politician and diplomat.
S. Arthur Spiegel, 94, American federal judge.
Valerian Wellesley, 8th Duke of Wellington, 99, British aristocrat and Army officer.

References

2014-12
 12